Monosynamma is a genus of true bugs belonging to the family Miridae.

The species of this genus are found in Europe and Northern America.

Species
 Monosynamma bohemanni (Fallen, 1829) 
 Monosynamma maritima (Wagner, 1947) 
 Monosynamma sabulicola (Wagner, 1947)

References

External links

Miridae genera
Nasocorini